Leonida "Loni" Nedelcu (also known as Leonida Nedelcu II; born 14 August 1952) is a Romanian former professional footballer who played as a striker, currently the manager of WOSPAC Palestina. In his career "Loni" Nedelcu played for various Romanian teams such as: Gloria Buzău, Universitatea Craiova, UTA Arad, Politehnica Timișoara or Bihor Oradea, among others. In the late years of his player career, Nedelcu started also to coach at Strungul Arad and CFR Timișoara. As a coach he is recognized as a true globe-trotter, managing very successfully teams from Romania, Syria, Morocco, Myanmar, Maldives, Iraq, Saudi Arabia and most recently Palestine.

International career
Leonida Nedelcu played in 30 matches for Romania and in other 4 matches for Romania U-21 and Romania B.

Personal life
His daughter is married to the former Gloria Buzău goalkeeper Antoniu Stoian.

References

External links
 
 
 Leonida Nedelcu at romaniastats.wordpress.com

1952 births
Living people
People from Râmnicu Sărat
Romanian footballers
Association football forwards
Romania under-21 international footballers
Romania international footballers
Liga I players
Liga II players
FC Gloria Buzău players
FCM Dunărea Galați players
CS Universitatea Craiova players
FC UTA Arad players
FC Politehnica Timișoara players
FC Bihor Oradea players
FC CFR Timișoara players
Romanian football managers
Romanian expatriate football managers
FC Gloria Buzău managers
FCM Târgoviște managers
Al-Hazm FC managers
Saudi First Division League managers
Romanian expatriate sportspeople in Iraq
Expatriate football managers in Iraq
Romanian expatriate sportspeople in Morocco
Expatriate football managers in Morocco
Romanian expatriate sportspeople in Myanmar
Expatriate football managers in Myanmar
Romanian expatriate sportspeople in the State of Palestine
Expatriate football managers in the State of Palestine
Romanian expatriate sportspeople in Saudi Arabia
Expatriate football managers in Saudi Arabia
Romanian expatriate sportspeople in Senegal
Expatriate football managers in Senegal
Romanian expatriate sportspeople in Syria
Expatriate football managers in Syria
Expatriate football managers in the Maldives